The Dargin languages consist of a dialect continuum of Northeast Caucasian languages spoken in southcentral Dagestan. Kajtak, Kubachi, Itsari, and Chirag are often considered dialects of the same Dargin/Dargwa language. Ethnologue lists these under a common Dargin language, but also states that these may be separate languages from Dargwa proper.

References 

Northeast Caucasian languages